John Alexander McGeoch (25 August 1955 – 4 March 2004) was a Scottish musician and songwriter. He is best known as the guitarist of the rock bands Magazine (1977-1980) and Siouxsie and the Banshees (1980-1982).

He has been described as one of the most influential guitarists of his generation. In 1996 he was listed by Mojo in their "100 Greatest Guitarists of All Time" for his work on the Siouxsie and the Banshees song "Spellbound". Signature characteristics of his playing style included inventive arpeggios, string harmonics, the uses of flanger and an occasional disregard for conventional scales.

He was also a member of the bands Visage (1979-1980), the Armoury Show (1983-1986) and Public Image Ltd (1986-1992).

McGeoch has been cited as an influence by guitarists including Johnny Marr, Jonny Greenwood, Ed O'Brien, the Edge, John Frusciante, Steve Albini, Duane Denison, and Dave Navarro.

Early life
McGeoch was born on 25 August 1955 in Greenock, Renfrewshire, Scotland, where he spent his childhood years. He began to play the guitar at 12 years of age, first learning British blues music, being influenced by the work of Eric Clapton, and also that of Jimi Hendrix. He took piano lessons for five years until the age of twelve. When his parents bought him a guitar, he stopped piano. In 1970 he played with a local band called the 'Slugband'. In 1971 his parents moved to London.

In 1975 he went to art school in Manchester where he received a degree in Fine Art. In his final year in 1976, he was enraptured by a new music that "ended up being called punk rock". He qualified it "the revolution, and I really do think that's the right word for it". He maintained an interest in photography, painting and drawing throughout his life.

Career

1977–1980: Magazine and Visage
In April 1977 McGeoch's Manchester student flatmate Malcolm Garrett introduced him to Howard Devoto, who had recently left the band Buzzcocks and was looking for a guitarist to form a band with. The pair formed a new act entitled Magazine, along with Barry Adamson, Bob Dickinson and Martin Jackson. The new band released its debut single, "Shot by Both Sides" in January 1978. The song's music was written by Pete Shelley with new Devoto lyrics ( Buzzcocks version was titled "Lipstick"); on release it reached #41 on the UK Singles Chart. (The same year McGeoch graduated from Manchester Polytechnic).

McGeoch went on to play on Magazine's first three albums, Real Life (1978), Secondhand Daylight (1979) and The Correct Use of Soap (1980). He left the band in 1980 shortly after the release of the latter album, frustrated with its lack of commercial success despite its recognition with music press critics.

In 1979, while still a member of Magazine, McGeoch joined Steve Strange's electronic band Visage along with erstwhile Magazine bandmates Adamson and Dave Formula, recording songs for their first single "Tar" and later, in 1980, for their eponymous album Visage, McGeoch playing guitar and saxophone on the record.

Although he saw Visage as something of a joke, the band provided McGeoch with early professional credibility and success. The band's single "Fade to Grey" went to #1 in a number of European countries and McGeoch said the money from the song allowed him to buy a house. McGeoch did not record on the group's second album, The Anvil, as it was recorded in London and he was unable to participate.

While still a member of Magazine and Visage, McGeoch also worked occasionally with other bands. In mid-1980 he recorded most of the guitar work on Gen X's album Kiss Me Deadly at AIR Studios in London. He left Magazine during that time. In September 1980 he guested with the Skids for a Peel Session, standing in for Stuart Adamson who was unwell. Other session work included Tina Turner's comeback track with the British Electric Foundation and for Propaganda He also collaborated with ex-Magazine drummer John Doyle on Ken Lockie's album The Impossible.

1980–1982: Siouxsie and the Banshees
When recording with Siouxsie and the Banshees in early 1980, McGeoch entered a period of both creative and commercial success. During his first session with the Banshees he began a new style of playing. He later commented: "I was going through a picky phase, as opposed to strumming. "Happy House" was lighter and had more musicality in it. They invited me to join. I was sad leaving Magazine but the Banshees were so interesting and it felt like a good move". He became an official member of the group at the release of "Israel" in November 1980, which was the first single he composed with the band.

He recorded guitar on the Banshees' long-players Kaleidoscope (1980), Juju (1981) and A Kiss in the Dreamhouse (1982). The Banshees' hit singles of this era featured some of McGeoch's most acclaimed work, particularly 1980's "Happy House", "Christine" and "Israel", and 1981's "Spellbound" and "Arabian Knights". McGeoch's contribution to the band was important in terms of sounds and style. Singer Siouxsie Sioux later said:  However, McGeoch suffered a nervous breakdown due to the stresses of touring and an increasing personal problem with alcohol. He arrived in Madrid for a promotional stay in bad state and made several uncharacteristic mistakes at a gig. Back home, he was forced to leave the band in October 1982 to rest and recover.

1983–1986: The Armoury Show
In 1983, during a break from playing music, he produced Swedish punk-funk band Zzzang Tumb's debut long-player.

He joined the band the Armoury Show which included Doyle as well as ex-Skids members Richard Jobson and Russell Webb. Their album Waiting for the Floods released in 1985, features some of McGeoch's best guitar work. He contributed to former Bauhaus singer Peter Murphy's debut solo long-player Should the World Fail to Fall Apart.

1986–1992: Public Image Ltd
In 1986, McGeoch joined John Lydon's Public Image Ltd, a decision which may have been partly motivated by financial difficulties he was in at this time. He had been an admirer of PiL, particularly of Lydon's lyrics, yet reportedly had previously turned down an offer from him to join the band in 1984. Despite being struck in the face with a bottle thrown from the crowd during one of his first gigs with the band, McGeoch remained with PiL until it disbanded in 1992, making him the longest-serving member apart from Lydon. He recorded on its long-players: Happy?, 9 and That What Is Not’'.

In 1992 he was invited by the Icelandic band the Sugarcubes to play the lead guitar on the song "Gold" for their Stick Around for Joy long-player.

1993–2004: Last years
Without a band, he ended his career seeking to form one via a variety of short-lived ventures, including working with Glenn Gregory and the songwriter/producer Keith Lowndes. With John Keeble of Spandau Ballet and vocalist Clive Farrington of When in Rome, he formed a line-up provisionally titled 'Pacific', but no commercial material came of it.

In the mid-1990s McGeoch retired from professional music and trained mid-life as a nurse/carer. In the early 2000s he was reported as attempting to re-enter professional music by working on musical scores for television productions.

Legacy
McGeoch has been cited as a major influence by numerous guitarists. Johnny Marr from the Smiths said: "When I was in my teens, there weren't many new guitar players who were interesting and of their time.[...] John McGeoch. [His work] was really innovative guitar music which was pretty hard to find back then. To a young guitar player like myself, those early Banshees singles were just class". Simon Goddard wrote that McGeoch was a "significant inspiration" on Marr. Marr said: "Really my generation was all about a guy called John McGeoch, from Siouxsie and the Banshees".

Radiohead have cited McGeoch's work with Magazine and Siouxsie and the Banshees as an influence. The lead guitarist, Jonny Greenwood, said McGeoch was the guitarist that had most influenced him. The Radiohead guitarist Ed O'Brien also cited him as a "big influence", and one of the "great guitarists [who] weren't lead guitarists". He said that McGeoch was "responsible for some of the greatest riffs ever ... 'Spellbound', 'Christine', 'Happy House'... His riffs are so elegant and once you learn how to play them there is almost a zen like quality to the sound and movement of your hands. it reminds me of the beauty in Johnny Marr's playing." For their 2003 single "There There", Radiohead's producer Nigel Godrich encouraged Greenwood to play like McGeoch in Siouxsie and the Banshees. 

Dave Navarro of Jane's Addiction said that he "always loved all the different guitarists that have been in Siouxsie and the Banshees". John Frusciante of Red Hot Chili Peppers named McGeoch in his primary influences: "[McGeoch] is such a guitarist I aspire to be. He has a new brilliant idea for each song. I usually play on the stuff he does on Magazine's albums and Siouxsie & the Banshees's like Juju." Frusciante praised him as a musician "who played in more textural ways" and who made "interesting music".  Frusciante "bought an SG, because I’m a big fan of John McGeoch from Siouxsie and the Banshees and Magazine. When I’d play along with his records using a Strat, the parts sounded too thin and weak for the simple power of his playing. In learning the SG, I had to teach myself to bend in a brand-new way and use new muscles to do vibrato."

The Edge of U2 cited McGeoch as an influence and chose the Siouxsie and the Banshees song "Christine" for a compilation made for Mojo. Interviewed in March 1987, the Edge said his "background is much more Tom Verlaine and John McGeoch". In a playlist, William Reid of the Jesus and Mary Chain selected two of McGeoch's songs, "Spellbound" by the Banshees and "Definitive Gaze" by Magazine.

Steve Albini of Big Black praised McGeoch for his guitar playing with Magazine and Siouxsie and the Banshees, qualifying as "great choral swells, great scratches and buzzes, great dissonant noise and great squealy death noise. What a guy" and further commenting: "anybody can make notes. There's no trick. What is a trick and a good one is to make a guitar do things that don't sound like a guitar at all. The point here is stretching the boundaries". Duane Denison of the Jesus Lizard chose McGeoch as his favorite guitarist for his work with Magazine and the Banshees, especially on Juju, saying: "his playing was atmospheric and aggressive" and "truly inspiring to me". Mark Arm of Mudhoney "loved [McGeoch's] work with Magazine and Siouxsie And The Banshees".

Terry Bickers of the House of Love cited him as one of his favourite musicians. James Dean Bradfield of the Manic Street Preachers said that McGeoch was "slightly avant-garde. He was a genius". Bradfield added that McGeoch's guitar-playing makes "you realize you were listening to a new version of rock and roll".  

Stuart Braithwaite of Mogwai qualified McGeoch as "the best post-punk guitarist", saying, "he played like no-one else, totally distinct and with unyielding imagination. I hear his influence everywhere to this day", and dubbed him "a total legend". James Graham of the Twilight Sad cited him as one "of the guitarists I still continue to revisit when I’m writing. The ideas they were coming up with at the time still sound as fresh just now as they did back then".

In 2008, the BBC aired an hour-long radio documentary on McGeoch's life and work, titled Spellbound: The John McGeoch Story.

Omnibus Press released a book titled The Light Pours Out of Me: The Authorised Biography of John McGeoch in April 2022. It features recent interviews of musicians who admire McGeoch's work: the author of the biography, Rory Sullivan-Burke, met Greenwood, Marr, Frusciante, Siouxsie and many other musicians, relatives and friends.

Equipment
During his time with Magazine McGeoch played a Yamaha SG1000 guitar with a stand-mounted MXR M117R flanger. He bought his first model in 1977 when the band signed its recording deal, which provided him with the finances for professional standard equipment. Whilst with Siouxsie and the Banshees he created his own setup, involving a MXR flanger mounted on a mic stand which allowed him to hit a chord and sweep the flange knob in real time. He also played on a 12 String Ovation acoustic guitar. He also used a MXR Dynacomp Compressor and a Yamaha Analog Delay. His amps were a Roland Jazz Chorus JC120 and two Marshall MV50 combos. His use of flange and chorus added depth and space to his parts.

Whilst working with 'The Armoury Show', he also used a customised Telecaster, a white Squier 1957 Stratocaster, an Ibanez AE410BK and an Ibanex AE100. For pedals, alongside his 'flanger on a stick', he was using an MXR Compressor, two Ibanez harmonisers and an Ibanez Super Metal pedal. During his work with PiL, and in his last years he favoured a solid wood Carvin electric guitar. He also used a Washburn Tour 24 guitar for touring during 1988.

Personal life
On 9 September 1981, McGeoch married Janet Pickford, his girlfriend at Manchester Polytechnic, the marriage later ending in divorce. On 14 September 1988, he married Denise Dakin, the second marriage producing a daughter, Emily Jean McGeoch (b. 1989).

Death
McGeoch died at the age of 48 in his sleep on 4 March 2004 at his home in Launceston, Cornwall from Sudden unexpected death in epilepsy.

Tribute
Banshees' drummer Budgie wrote a text to honour him on the Siouxsie website, saying: "Without any disrespect to all the other guitarists we have worked with, none had the relaxed mastery and such a depth of expression as John McGeoch. No amount of scrutiny of filmed 'Live' performance tapes could reveal the subtle economy of technique that made an apparently complex phrase look so deceptively simple. Exasperated guitarists would often comment, "But his hands don’t even move!".

Discography
Albums (as band member)
MagazineReal Life (1978)Secondhand Daylight (1979)The Correct Use of Soap (1980)
VisageVisage (1980)
Siouxsie and the BansheesKaleidoscope (1980)Juju (1981)A Kiss in the Dreamhouse (1982)
Armoury ShowWaiting for the Floods (1985)
Public Image LtdHappy? (1987)9 (1989)That What Is Not (1992)

Albums (as a guest musician)
with Gen XKiss Me Deadly (1981)
with Ken LockieThe Impossible (1981)
with Peter MurphyShould the World Fail to Fall Apart (1986)
with The SugarcubesStick Around for Joy'' (1992)

Bibliography

References

External links
 
 Fodderstompf.Com: John McGeoch Biography
 John McGeoch MySpace Account (set up by his daughter)
 Profile of John McGeoch from shotbybothsides.com
 Interview with John McGeoch from shotbybothsides.com
 Interview with John McGeoch and Richard Jobson of Armoury Show

1955 births
2004 deaths
Scottish rock guitarists
Scottish male guitarists
Magazine (band) members
Siouxsie and the Banshees members
Public Image Ltd members
The Armoury Show members
Gothic rock musicians
British post-punk musicians
Scottish new wave musicians
People from Greenock
20th-century British guitarists
20th-century British male musicians
Visage (band) members